SMK Bandar Baru Sultan Suleiman (SMKBBSS) located in Bandar Sultan Suleiman, Port Klang, Selangor. The school was opened in 2003, takes its name from the combination of the name of the Sultan of Selangor, Sultan Alauddin Sulaiman Shah ibni Almarhum Raja Muda Musa and the locality.

This school was originally a technique school. But after residents asked to be a secondary school building is made of the premises there, then secondary school, which is SMKBBSS, agreed to be the local resident school. The school is under the administration of PPD Klang.

Schools in Selangor